Robert Jones (1704 – 17 February 1774) was a Welsh-born politician. 

He was born in Wales and in 1743 had gone into partnership with a merchant in Gibraltar. He was appointed an Elder Brother of Trinity House for life in 1753 and elected a director of the East India Company in 1754 and 1765, serving in both cases for the conventional 3 years. 

He was a Member of Parliament for Huntingdon from 15 April 1754 to 1768. At that time he was described as a wine merchant.

In July 1770 Jones bought Babraham in Cambridgeshire and demolished the Elizabethan manor house which had been built in the Italian style by Sir Horatio Pallavicini [Palavicino].

He died in 1774. He had married and had a daughter, but as his daughter had married J. W. Adeane without his approval, he made his grandson Robert Jones Adeane his heir.

References

1704 births
1774 deaths
British merchants
British MPs 1754–1761
British MPs 1761–1768
Members of the Parliament of Great Britain for English constituencies
Directors of the British East India Company
People from Huntingdonshire
People from Babraham
Members of Trinity House